Fayek is an Arabic origin word which is used as a surname and a masculine given name. People with the name include:

Surname
 Mohamed Fayek (born 1929), Egyptian politician
 Youssef Fayek (born 2000), Libyan football player

Given name

First name
 Fayek 'Adly 'Azb (1958–2021), Egyptian boxer
 Fayek Matta Ishak (1922–2006), Egyptian Canadian writer and scholar
 Fayek Abdullah Muhhamadi Afandi Mala Rassul, known as Zewar (poet) (1875–1948), Iraqi Kurdish poet and writer

Middle name
 Mohammad Fayek Uz Zaman, Bangladeshi academic 

Arabic masculine given names
Surnames of Egyptian origin
Surnames of Libyan origin